HZVV is a football club from Hoogeveen, Netherlands. HZVV plays in the 2017–18 Saturday Hoofdklasse B.

References

External links
 Official site

Football clubs in the Netherlands
Association football clubs established in 1929
1929 establishments in the Netherlands
Football clubs in Hoogeveen